The broadnose wedgefish (Rhynchobatus springeri) is a species of fish in the Rhinidae family. It is found in coastal and estuarine habitats in southeast Asia, where documented from Java, Borneo, Singapore, the Philippines and Thailand. It is threatened by habitat loss and overfishing.

Etymology
The ray is named in honor of Stewart Springer (5 June 1906 – 23 August 1991), because of his contributions to the systematics of Rhynchobatus.

References

broadnose wedgefish
Marine fauna of Southeast Asia
Taxa named by Leonard Compagno
Taxa named by Peter R. Last
Fish described in 2010
Taxonomy articles created by Polbot